Kapeli, is a village in the municipal unit of Dymi in Achaea. The village lies 2 km south from Kato Achaia and 1 km northwest of Agiovlasitika.

Historical population

See also
List of settlements in Achaea

References

Populated places in Achaea
Dymi, Achaea
Villages in Greece